The bottom quark or b quark, also known as the beauty quark, is a third-generation heavy quark with a charge of − e.

All quarks are described in a similar way by electroweak and quantum chromodynamics, but the bottom quark has exceptionally low rates of transition to lower-mass quarks. The bottom quark is also notable because it is a product in almost all top quark decays, and is a frequent decay product of the Higgs boson.

Name and history
The bottom quark was first described theoretically in 1973 by physicists Makoto Kobayashi and Toshihide Maskawa to explain CP violation. The name "bottom" was introduced in 1975 by Haim Harari.

The bottom quark was discovered in 1977 by the Fermilab E288 experiment team led by Leon M. Lederman, when collisions produced bottomonium. Kobayashi and Maskawa won the 2008 Nobel Prize in Physics for their explanation of CP-violation.

While the name "beauty" is sometimes used, "bottom" became the predominant usage by analogy of "top" and "bottom" to "up" and "down".

Distinct character
The bottom quark's "bare" mass is around  – a bit more than four times the mass of a proton, and many orders of magnitude larger than common "light" quarks.

Although it almost exclusively transitions from or to a top quark, the bottom quark can decay into either an up quark or charm quark via the weak interaction. CKM matrix elements  and  specify the rates, where both these decays are suppressed, making lifetimes of most bottom particles (~10−12 s) somewhat longer than those of charmed particles (~10−13 s), but shorter than those of strange particles (from ~10−10 to ~10−8 s).

The combination of high mass and low transition rate gives experimental collision byproducts containing a bottom quark a distinctive signature that makes them relatively easy to identify using a technique called "B-tagging". For that reason, mesons containing the bottom quark are exceptionally long-lived for their mass, and are the easiest particles to use to investigate CP violation. Such experiments are being performed at the BaBar, Belle and LHCb experiments.

Hadrons containing bottom quarks

Some of the hadrons containing bottom quarks include:
B mesons contain a bottom quark (or its antiparticle) and an up or down quark.
 and  mesons contain a bottom quark along with a charm quark or strange quark respectively.
There are many bottomonium states, for example the  meson and χb(3P), the first particle discovered in LHC.  These consist of a bottom quark and its antiparticle.
Bottom baryons have been observed, and are named in analogy with strange baryons (e.g. ).

See also
Quark model
B-factory
B meson

References

Further reading

External links
 History of the discovery of the bottom quark / Upsilon meson 

Elementary particles
Quarks